Kenswick is a village and civil parish (with Wichenford) in the Malvern Hills District in  the county of Worcestershire, England.

External links
Kenswick-Wichenford parish council official website
Former Kenswick parish website.(WaybackMachine)

Villages in Worcestershire
Civil parishes in Worcestershire
Malvern Hills District